Still River may refer to the following:

Still River (novel), by Hal Clement

In Canada:
Still River, Ontario

In the United States:
Still River (Housatonic River), a tributary of the Housatonic River
Still River, Massachusetts, a village in Worcester County